The Golda Meir School (originally Fourth Street School) for gifted and talented students is a Milwaukee Public Schools district elementary, middle, and high school in Milwaukee, Wisconsin. The school offers classes for students in grades three through twelve.

In 1979 the school was renamed in honor of Golda Meir, the fourth Prime Minister of Israel, who attended the institution from 1906 to 1912. There are two campuses: the lower campus and the upper campus. The 1890 lower campus building is a National Historic Landmark, designated in 1990 for its association with Meir.

Description 
Situated next to the historic Schlitz Brewing Complex of the same era, the Fourth Street School, now the Meir School lower campus, was designed in 1889 by noted Milwaukee architect Henry C. Koch in Romanesque Revival style. Hallmarks of the style are the rough stone foundation (to give it a sense of rootedness) and the round-topped arches. The school was completed by 1890 and opened its doors on September 2, 1890.

H-shaped in plan, the school building has four stories (basement included) and contains 16 classrooms along with an auditorium. A single story heating plant was added in 1915, with a fuel room to follow in 1937. Fire escapes and enclosure of the stairways brought the building up to code in 1957. Renovation of the interior and exterior took place in 1976, during which a cafeteria was added.

Golda Meir had three classrooms in grade 3, grade 4, and grade 5.  That left it with only enough room for one class in grade 6, grade 7, and grade 8.  As a result, there were about 90 students in each of the elementary grades but only 30 students in each of the middle school grades.  The 60 other students had to go to school somewhere else after grade 5.  In 2011, parents asked the school board to allow grade 6 though 8 to move into the closed Milwaukee Education Center middle school, which is adjacent to Golda Meir's property.  The building previously housed the Malt House of the long-closed Schlitz Brewery.  The expansion has allowed all of Golda Meir's students to remain in the school.  Golda Meir added grade 9 in 2014 and will continue to add grades until the Schlitz building has a high school population of 600 students.

Golda Meir School, as it was renamed on May 4, 1979, is one of the city's original magnet schools. The Gifted and Talented Program was implemented in the 1970s to further stimulate and develop the abilities of talented pupils. A two block long mural on the playground retaining wall was started in 1979 by students. Titled "Milwaukee Illustrated" it  celebrated the city's history until removed in 1998 to make way for a new theme, "Golda's Gallery: The Decades on Display."

In commemoration of the events of September 11, 2001, a "Labyrinth of Peace" was drawn on to the school playground. The single circuit labyrinth is used as a tool for students to reflect on what peace means to them.

Golda Meir, immigrant student 

Golda Meir was born Golda Mabovitch in Kiev, Ukraine in 1898 to a Jewish family and spent her early years in the part of Imperial Russia where Jews were allowed to live. In 1903 her father Moshe came to Milwaukee to work as a carpenter. In 1906 Golda, her sister, and her mother followed. The family settled on Walnut Street at the south end of the Brewer's Hill neighborhood, and Golda enrolled at the Fourth Street School.

She recounts in her book My Life that she "learned a lot more than fractions or how to spell at Fourth Street School..." When she was in fourth grade, Meir undertook her first public works project by organizing a fundraiser to pay for her classmates' textbooks. She rented a hall and scheduled a public meeting for the event.

In 1912 the girl who had arrived as a poor Jewish-Ukrainian immigrant with weak English graduated from Fourth Street School as valedictorian. Four years later she graduated from Milwaukee's North Division High School and entered teachers' college, but her interest in Palestine was growing. She joined the Labor Zionist Movement in 1915, led rallies for them, and during WWI worked for Jewish relief programs and taught Yiddish in Milwaukee's Jewish Community Center. She kept Milwaukee as her home base until 1920, when she and her husband moved to New York, then emigrated to Palestine in 1921.  She later wrote: I took a  great deal with me from America to Palestine, more perhaps than I can express: an understanding of the meaning of freedom, and awareness of the opportunities offered to the individual in a true democracy and a permanent nostalgia for the great beauty of the American countryside. In Palestine she worked for the labor organization Histadrut and in the 1930s she traveled back to the U.S. to lecture and raise funds for the Jews of Palestine. During WWII she worked to rescue Jews from the Nazis. In 1948, as European Jews flooded to Palestine and around the time the State of Israel was established, she returned to the U.S. to raise more funds for Israel. In following years she served as Israel's ambassador to the Soviet Union, Minister of Labor, Foreign Minister, and Prime Minister from 1969 to 1974.

On October 3, 1969, Prime Minister Meir revisited her old Fourth Street School in Milwaukee, accompanied by U.S. National Security Advisor Henry Kissinger and local Aldermen Vel Phillips and Orville Pitts. The school was renamed in her honor in 1979.

The school was listed on the National Register of Historic Places in 1984.  It was declared a National Historic Landmark in 1990.  It is one of three buildings in the United States with a significant association with Meir. A plaque mounted outside the front door of the school reads in part "it was here that she learned the values that carried her through life."

See also
List of National Historic Landmarks in Wisconsin
National Register of Historic Places listings in Milwaukee, Wisconsin

References

External links 
Golda Meir School
Golda Meir: My Life

Magnet schools in Wisconsin
Education in Milwaukee
Buildings and structures in Milwaukee
National Historic Landmarks in Wisconsin
School buildings completed in 1890
Public elementary schools in Wisconsin
School buildings on the National Register of Historic Places in Wisconsin
National Register of Historic Places in Milwaukee
Golda Meir